Morningside railway station is located on the Cleveland line in Queensland, Australia. It serves the Brisbane suburb of Morningside.

History
Morningside station opened in 1888 as Bulimba, being renamed Morningside shortly afterwards.

On 26 May 1996, the timber station building was burnt out and later demolished. On 15 July 1996, the Fisherman Islands line to the Port of Brisbane opened to the north of the station.

Services
Morningside is served by Cleveland line services from Shorncliffe, Northgate, Doomben and Bowen Hills to Cannon Hill, Manly and Cleveland.

Services by platform

References

External links

Morningside station Queensland's Railways on the Internet
[ Morningside station] TransLink travel information

Railway stations in Brisbane
Railway stations in Australia opened in 1888